Anthology is the first greatest hits album for the Steve Miller Band, covering material from their first seven albums (though there are no selections from either Children of the Future or Rock Love).  It has been certified Gold in the United States.

Critical reception

In a retrospective review for Allmusic, Stephen Thomas Erlewine feels that the album captures Miller's "first-rate" and "effective" early space blues, and that the songs are less commercial and "catchy" than those on Miller's later Greatest Hits album.

Track listing
Side 1
"I Love You" (Miller) – 2:46 - from Number 5 (1970)
"Going To The Country" (Miller, Sidran) – 3:14 (Number 5)
"Baby's House" (Hopkins, Miller) – 8:07 - from Your Saving Grace (1969)
"Kow Kow Calqulator" (Miller) – 4:26 - from Brave New World (1969)
Side 2
"Your Saving Grace" (Davis, Miller, Sidran) – 4:50 (Your Saving Grace)
"Going To Mexico" (Miller, Scaggs) – 2:29 (Number 5) 
"Space Cowboy" (Miller, Sidran) – 4:55 (Brave New World)
"Living In The U.S.A." (Miller) – 4:06 - from Sailor (1968)
Side 3
"Journey From Eden" (Miller) – 6:25 - from Recall the Beginning...A Journey from Eden  (1972) 
"Seasons" (Miller, Sidran) – 3:51 (Brave New World)
"Motherless Children" (Traditional) – 4:22 (Your Saving Grace)
"Never Kill Another Man" (Miller) – 2:44 (Number 5)
Side 4
"Don't You Let Nobody Turn You Around" (Miller) – 2:29 (Your Saving Grace)
"Little Girl" (Miller) – 3:24 (Your Saving Grace)
"Celebration Song" (Miller, Sidran) – 2:32 (Brave New World)
"My Dark Hour" (Miller) – 3:08 (Brave New World)

"Going To The Country", "Baby's House" and "Motherless Children" are shorter edits than their original LP versions.

Personnel

 Steve Miller – guitar, vocals, harmonica, bass
 Boz Scaggs – vocals, guitar
 Paul McCartney – vocals, bass, drums
 Tim Davis – vocals, drums, percussion
 James Curley Cook – guitar
 Buddy Spicher – violin
 Charlie McCoy – harmonica
 Nicky Hopkins – piano, organ
 Richard Thompson – piano, organ
 Ben Sidran – piano, keyboards
 James Peterman organ, vocals
 Lee Michaels – organ
 Gerald Johnson – organ
 Lonnie Turner – bass -(most songs) - organ
 Bob Winkelman – bass
 Gary Mallaber – drums
 Glyn Johns – vocals
 Thomas Lunde – album art

References

1972 greatest hits albums
Steve Miller Band compilation albums
Capitol Records compilation albums